Uruguay had the first welfare state of Latin America under the presidency of José Batlle y Ordoñez in 1904. Government-owned corporations monopolize services such as electricity (UTE), land-line communications (Antel) and water (OSE). Antel competes with private corporations in the cell-phone lines and international telephony markets. 
In 1992, under the presidency of Luis Alberto Lacalle, the government attempted to privatize all its companies, following the neoliberal Washington Consensus. However, a referendum won by 75% of the population kept the companies in the hands of the government. By the end of his term, president Lacalle alleged that he had achieved a successful modernization of the companies, which had made them more efficient.

State-owned companies in Uruguay are generically known as Entes Autónomos y Servicios Descentralizados:

  ANCAP
  ANTEL
  Banco de la República Oriental del Uruguay
  Banco de Previsión Social
  Banco Hipotecario del Uruguay
  Central Bank of Uruguay
  Obras Sanitarias del Estado
  PLUNA
  SODRE
  State Railways Administration of Uruguay
  University of the Republic
  UTE

References

 
Uruguay